Cinema Insomnia is a nationally syndicated American television series presented by horror host Mr. Lobo.

Format 
Typically, Mr. Lobo opens each episode by promising to screen a well-known horror or science fiction classic (such as Creature from the Black Lagoon or Alien); however budgetary limitations, acts of God or other circumstances invariably force him to show a much lower quality movie (such as Starcrash or Santa Claus Conquers The Martians).

Unlike the various hosts and robots of Mystery Science Theater 3000, Mr. Lobo does not appear while the movie is playing; instead he appears in brief vignettes in between segments of the movie. Also included are fake commercials (one such was for "Rad Abrams – Skateboard Attorney"), old movie trailers, classic commercials, and footage and interviews shot at horror conventions, science fiction conventions, and film festivals across the country.

Characters 
Mr. Lobo always appears on screen with a "70's professional" haircut, wearing "birth control" glasses and a black suit and tie. He acts as a spectral narrator broadcasting from a black void and his only connections to reality are the B-movies he presents. Mr. Lobo has often described himself by saying, "Imagine if you gave Rod Serling's job to someone who is totally incompetent."

Mr. Lobo often has one-sided conversations with Miss Mittens, a houseplant.

Recurring characters 
Artie-Deco (Hardware Wars)
Astra Naughty
Chewchilla the Wookie Monster (Hardware Wars)
Dr. Bling Bling
Dr. Loco
Ernie Fosselius
François Fly (Fly By Night Theater)
Lady Skank'nstein (The Horror House of Lady Skank'nstein)
Megafant
Movie Sniffing Tie
Naughty Nurse Batty
Prime-8
Puddles the Super Turtle
Ro-man (Robot Monster)
Robot Seven D 4
Slob Zombie
Super Argo
The Incredibly Strange Creatures (Band)
The Robot Monsters (Band)
The Louisiana Klingons (Trekkies)
The Phantom of Krankor (Prince of Space)
The Queen of Trash
Will the Thrill (Thrillville)
Young Mr. Lobo

Episodes

Broadcast history 
Cinema Insomnia began in 2001 when showrunner Mr Lobo was working for KXTV ABC News10 in Sacramento. Inspired by Creature Features horror host Bob Wilkins, Lobo suggested a filler segment for the station's late night 3am movie which ran twenty minutes short. KXTV immediately picked up the show upon submission of the pilot episode. Cinema Insmonia ran for 22 episodes (2001–2002) before the show was put on permanent hiatus. The second version of the show was made for local community television Access Sacramento, and ran for one year on Comcast Channel 17 and 18. This version of the show was also distributed to public-access television cable TV stations across the country via the Horror Host Underground. From 2003 to 2008 Cinema Insomnia was nationally syndicated airing on broadcast stations across the country. In 2008 Apprehensive Films, an indie distribution label, signed the show to release exclusive Cinema Insomnia DVDs. In 2009, Apprehensive Films took over the television distribution of the show as well, which resulted in re-licensing the show to AMGTV.

Cinema Insomnia has aired weekly on over 34 broadcast stations including KXTV ABC News10 (Sacramento, Stockton, Modesto, California), KEJB 43 (Louisiana), KTEH 54 (San Jose, Oakland, San Francisco), WOTH (Cincinnati), and WAOH-LP (Cleveland). It also is shown on hundreds of cable systems via MavTV (national), MATA14 (Wisconsin), Cox 71 (Virginia) and Cox 99 (Indiana).

It is delivered to independent stations via various outlets PMI, Access Media Group, and AMGTV. Several episodes are also available for download on the Internet via BitTorrent as well as on CinemaInsomnia.com. The 2006 Cinema Insomnia Halloween Special was delivered to 45 million households.

A Kickstarter project called "Cinema Insomnia 10 Year Anniversary" was started to help fund $10,000 for the new season to give each episode an additional $384 to help pay for cast and crew as well as other expenses. On December 18, 2010, $11,140 had been raised.

The first film of the 2011–2012 season was Venus Flytrap, it premiered on October 31, 2011. This was followed by Deep Red and War of the Planets which was co-hosted by Northern California horror host legend, John Stanley. A retro version of the show called Insomniac Theater featured the film The Atomic Brain and the Christmas special was the original The Little Shop of Horrors.

On October 30, 2015, Mister Lobo launched OSI74 (Outer Space International), a web television service available on Roku. Since then, Cinema Insomnia has aired 90 episodes over 5 seasons on OSI-74.

Live shows 
On August 19, 2006, Cinema Insomnia presented Day of the Triffids Live on KTEH, San Jose, CA.

On August 14, 2010, Cinema Insomnia had their first broadcast taping at the Guild Theater in Sacramento in front of a live audience. The film that was presented was The Undertaker and His Pals. Due to the graphic nature of the film, everyone was given a 'Barf-O-Vision' Audience Sickness Bag.

On June 8, 2019, Cinema Insomnia hosted 2 live shows at the Bal Theater in San Leandro, California. The matinee performance was the film Teenagers From Outer Space and the evening performance was Bride of the Monster. These live shows marked the first new appearances in many years of Cinema Insomnia mainstays Rad Abrams: Skateboard Attorney & "The Queen of Trash" Sara Dunn. The Live Shows were later broadcast on Mister Lobo's streaming channel OSI-74.

Online availability

Livestream 
In 2010, Cinema Insomnia episodes began streaming on Livestream.

On July 28, 2021, Mister Lobo ran a 10-day long live marathon of every episode of Cinema Insomnia on the official Cinema Insomnia Twitch channel.

YouTube 
In August 2012, Cinema Insomnia's official YouTube channel was terminated due to multiple third-party claims of copyright infringement which came from "dubious sources."

Lobovision 
In September 2012, a new service to stream Cinema Insomnia videos called Lobovision was made available starting with the episodes House on Haunted Hill and Dick Tracy Meets Gruesome.

In June 2013, Lobovision was redesigned with a new layout and look.

Roku 
In October 2012, Cinema Insomnia debuted on the new Roku horror channel Zom-Bee TV. Zom-Bee TV aired the first HD Cinema Insomnia episode with the 2009 film Maxwell Stein.

OSI 74 
Episodes of Cinema Insomnia now air on OSI 74, an online TV channel run by Outer Space International, Mr. Lobo's distribution network featuring "unusual, experimental, and entertaining programs from many different creative worlds". OSI 74 launched on October 30, 2015 on Roku. Cinema Insomnia episodes are also available on OSI74.com.

Slime Line 

In 2010, Apprehensive Films introduced a new line of Cinema Insomnia DVDs called the Slime Line. The Slime Line DVDs feature brand new audio mixes, new retro film-clips, coming attractions for classic B-movie and new indies. The Slime Line DVDs also contain Slime Points which can be collected and mailed into Apprehensive Films for select prizes. Apprehensive Films has also licensed episodes Dick Tracy Meets Gruesome, Gappa: Monsters From a Prehistoric Planet, In Search of Ancient Astronauts, Super Wheels, and Voyage to the Prehistoric Planet to Amazon Video on Demand.

List of Slime Line edition DVDs 
Bigfoot: Mysterious Monster
Carnival of Souls
Cinema Insomnia Halloween Special
Creature
Dick Tracy Meets Gruesome
Eegah
First Spaceship on Venus
Gamera: Super Monster
Gappa: Monsters From a Prehistoric Planet
In Search of Ancient Astronauts
Night of the Living Dead
Santa Claus Conquers the Martians
Super Wheels
Voyage to the Prehistoric Planet
The Wasp Woman

Alpha Video 
In September 2019, Alpha Video announced the first three of ten newly remastered Cinema Insomnia volumes to be released on DVD, September 17, 2019.

Twenty additional volumes have been released as of mid 2021.

List of Alpha Video DVDs 
Cinema Insomnia: 2014 Haunted House Special
Bob Wilkins: The Lost Tapes, a new extended release of the 2002 Bob Wilkins Halloween Special
Eegah!
Dick Tracy Meets Gruesome
Monster from a Prehistoric Planet
Santa Claus Conquers the Martians
The Screaming Skull
The Brain That Wouldn't Die
Horrors of Spider Island
The Wasp Woman
A Hard Day's Nightmare
House on Haunted Hill
Teenagers from Outer Space: Live!
Voyage to the Prehistoric Planet
Mark of the Damned
Xenia: Priestess of Night
Midget Zombie Takeover
Carnival of Souls
Night of the Living Dead
Bloodsuckers of the Atomic Swamp
American Werewolf in the Philippines
War of the Planets
War of the Robots

In popular culture 

In the first episode "Beware The Beast from Below" of the 2010 animated series Scooby-Doo! Mystery Incorporated, the unmasked villain Professor Emmanuel Raffalo is inspired by the horror host Mr. Lobo.

References

External links 

 

 
American horror fiction television series
2010s American television series
2001 American television series debuts
Horror hosts
American horror television films
Midnight movie television series
American motion picture television series
English-language television shows